Deuchar is a rural locality in the Southern Downs Region, Queensland, Australia. In the  Deuchar had a population of 295 people.

Geography 
The Southern railway enters the suburb from the north (Hendon) and exits to the south (Massie). The Warwick Allora Road also enters the locality from the north (Hendon, but to the east of the railway) and exits to the south (Massie, adjacent to the railway).

The land use is a mix of grazing on native vegetation and crop growing. The crops are mostly grown in the east of the locality.

History 
The locality is named after pioneer stock breeder John Deuchar who leased the Canal Creek pastoral run, managed the Rosenthal run, and was co-owner of Glengallan run from 1855 to 1870.

Deuchar Provisional School opened on 14 March 1904. On 1 January 1909 it became Deuchar State School. It was closed in 1921 due to low student number, but reopened in 1924. It closed permanently on 11 August 1967.

Deuchar railway station is an abandoned railway station on the Southern railway line. The station closed in 1989.

In the  Deuchar had a population of 295 people.

Economy 
There are a number of homesteads in the locality, including:

 Ellendee
 Kirkliston
 Kulai
 Leeson
 Lyndale Dexter Stud
 Peppers
 Ray-Van
 Rempi
 Rosenhoff
 Stilla Himmel
 Timburra
 Tunnimarra
 Virginia Farms
 Wallingden
 Warrawee
 Warwick Farm
 Wyoming

References 

Southern Downs Region
Localities in Queensland